Samuel Keimer  (1689–1742) was originally an English printer and emigrant who came to America and became an Early American printer. He was the original founder of The Pennsylvania Gazette.  On October 2, 1729, Benjamin Franklin bought this newspaper.

Early life
Keimer was born in the later part of the seventeenth century in the London Borough of Southwark, England. Keimer, like his only sibling, Mary, was at first a follower of the Camisards.

Keimer initially learned the trade of printing from a well known London printer. He then opened a printing business in 1713, after had learned his trade. His English business failed, however, and he was thrown into Fleet Prison (a debtors' prison) for not paying his debts. When he got out of prison he went to America leaving his English wife behind. He settled in Philadelphia.

In Pennsylvania
In 1712 Andrew Bradford was the first person to start a printing business in Philadelphia. In 1723 Keimer opened a printing business near the Market-house in the city. Keimer and Bradford were then the only printers in the colony of Pennsylvania. Keimer had come to America with an old printing press, and a worn-out font of English letters.

When Benjamin Franklin, aged 17, came to Philadelphia looking for a job in 1722, he went first to Bradford’s printing business. Bradford had no job openings, but introduced him to Keimer. Franklin found Keimer trying to set up a composition of his own, the mournful Aquila Rose, ... Clerk of the Assembly and a pretty poet, but having difficulty.  Keimer hired Franklin at this time to help put his printing press into working order, since Franklin showed mechanical ability;  his position as Keimer's assistant was Franklin's first paid job.

Later life
In later years Keimer's business dwindled and he had fallen into debt. In 1729, after a short term in prison and to avoid debtors, he fled the country to Barbados after selling his print shop and newspaper to Benjamin Franklin. In 1731, at Bridgetown, he published the Barbadoes Gazette. It  was the first newspaper in the Caribbean. In 1733 he was sued for a malicious statement in his paper. He continued to publish the newspaper until its operation ceased in 1738.

Works
While in debtors' prison Keimer wrote some works considered of little literary value: A Search after Religion among the many Modern Pretenders to it, London [1718], and A Brand Pluck'd from the Burning exemplify'd in the unparallel'd case of Samuel Keimer, London, 1718. A Brand Pluck'd from the Burning... contained disagreements and disputes of the French Protestants. It also spoke of prison life and included a letter from the English trader Daniel Defoe.

Death
Keimer died in 1742 aged 52–53.

References

Bibliography

 
 
 
 
 

1689 births
1742 deaths
People from the London Borough of Southwark
People from Bridgetown
Businesspeople from Philadelphia
English printers
English Quakers
18th-century American businesspeople
People of colonial Pennsylvania
American publishers (people)
English male poets
Colonial American printers